Hasan Hasanli (born 1991) is the Deputy Minister of Science and Education of the Republic of Azerbaijan.

Early life and education 
Hasan Hasanli was born in 1991 in the city of Nakhchivan. In 2009-2013, he received bachelor's and master's degrees in public policy and political sciences at Bristol and Cambridge universities in Great Britain within the framework of the "2007-2015 State Program for the Education of Azerbaijani Youth in Foreign Countries".

In 2015-2016, he completed active military service in the Armed Forces of the Republic of Azerbaijan.

He speaks Russian and English.

He is married and has two children.

Career 
Hasan Hasanli worked in the Ministry of Science and Education as a specialist, sector manager, ministerial adviser, deputy chief of staff and chairman of the board of the Agency for Quality Assurance in Education. From June 2021 to January 30, 2023, he worked as the Chief of Staff of the Ministry of Science and Education.

By the Decree of the President of the Republic of Azerbaijan on January 28, 2023, he was appointed as the Deputy Minister of Science and Education.

References 

Living people

1991 births
Alumni of the University of Bristol
Alumni of the University of Cambridge
Azerbaijani politicians